Magnus Lundgren (born 19 August 1964) is a Swedish sailor. He competed in the men's 470 event at the 1992 Summer Olympics.

References

External links
 

1964 births
Living people
Swedish male sailors (sport)
Olympic sailors of Sweden
Sailors at the 1992 Summer Olympics – 470
People from Lysekil Municipality
Sportspeople from Västra Götaland County
20th-century Swedish people